Kawaii Kon is an anime convention geared towards Japanese animation and comics held in the Honolulu area.

Programming
Kawaii Kon currently has AMV and anime screenings; industry, fan, and guest panels; Hall Cosplay contests, Masquerade/Cosplay Competitions, Art Shows, Artist Alley Contests, Concerts, Dances, and Karaoke, along with Video and Role Playing games, autographs, and a Dealer's Room.

History
Kawaii Kon was founded by Gamers Evolution Expo, LLC., a company started by Stan Dahlin, Marlon Stodghill and Scott Richardson. Dahlin is a Hawaii native himself, who was at the time based out of Atlanta, Georgia. As for why they decided to bring an anime convention to Hawaii, taken from the website: "Being a transplanted local boy living far away from home for a better part of a decade or more, I'm very proud to be hosting this show in my home state. You ask why? A number of reasons but to simply state it.... I love anime!"

Kawaii Kon was the first anime convention to be held in Hawaii. Local support for the convention by fans in the event's first year resulted in a surprising attendance level that surpassed the staff's expectations. Kawaii Kon 2020 was moved from May to August due to the COVID-19 pandemic, and was later cancelled. Comic Con Honolulu and Kawaii Kon were going to combine for the August 2020 event, until it was cancelled. Kawaii Kon 2021 was moved from April to November due to the COVID-19 pandemic, and was also later cancelled. Kawaii Kon held an online event on May 29-30, 2021. Comic Con Honolulu and Kawaii Kon combined for the 2022 event.

Event history

Pictures

References

External links

Kawaii Kon Website

Anime conventions in the United States
Recurring events established in 2005
2005 establishments in Hawaii
Annual events in Hawaii
Festivals in Hawaii
Culture of Honolulu
Japanese-American culture in Honolulu
Tourist attractions in Honolulu
Conventions in Hawaii